Jean-Luc Chéreau (born 25 August 1948) is a French businessman and son of the founder of Chereau trailers www.chereau.com, one of Europe's largest refrigerated trailer unit manufacturers.
He is also a former amateur racing driver. providing sponsorship to Larbre Compétition's GT racing activities from 1994-2002 as well as driving.

Racing record

24 Hours of Le Mans results

References

1948 births
Living people
French racing drivers
24 Hours of Le Mans drivers

Larbre Compétition drivers
FIA GT Championship drivers